Hostile Gospel is a two Part edition song by American hip hop artist Talib Kweli. The song was released as the second video from his studio album, Eardrum (2007). Part 1 was produced by American hip hop producer Just Blaze. Hostile Gospel Part 2 was produced by American hip hop producer DJ Khalil and featured reggae artist Sizzla.

There is also a remix to the Part 1 version which features rappers Joell Ortiz and Blu and R&B group Nina Sky.

Music video
The music video was released on March 9, 2008 The video appeared as the "New Joint of the Day" on BET's 106 & Park on March 9, 2008.

References

External links
 

2007 singles
Talib Kweli songs
Song recordings produced by Just Blaze
2007 songs
Warner Records singles
Songs written by Talib Kweli
Songs written by Just Blaze